Jonathan Restrepo Naranjo (born 14 August 1994) is a Colombian professional footballer who currently plays for the reserve team of Deportivo Pasto. He played as a midfielder for Sagan Tosu and Oita Trinita.

Career
Restrepo signed with Sagan Tosu of the J1 League in the off-season of 2013 and made his debut for the club on 20 March 2013 in the J.League Cup against FC Tokyo in which he started and played 78 minutes before being subbed off as the match ended 0–0.

After two seasons in Japan, Restrepo moved back to Colombia to join Deportivo Pasto. He made his debut for the club on 10 February 2015 against Jaguares de Córdoba.

Club statistics

References

External links

1994 births
Living people
Association football midfielders
Colombian footballers
Colombian expatriate footballers
J1 League players
J2 League players
Categoría Primera A players
Sagan Tosu players
Oita Trinita players
Deportivo Pasto footballers
Expatriate footballers in Japan
Place of birth missing (living people)